Euphorbia kopetdaghii is a species of plant in the family Euphorbiaceae. It is native to Iran and Turkmenistan.

References 

kopetdaghii
Flora of Iran
Flora of Turkmenistan